is a leading English tort law case on the test for a duty of care. The House of Lords, following the Court of Appeal, set out a "three-fold test". In order for a duty of care to arise in negligence:

 harm must be reasonably foreseeable as a potential result of the  defendant's conduct (as established in Donoghue v Stevenson), 
 the parties must be in a relationship of proximity, and
 it must be fair, just and reasonable to impose liability.

The final conclusion arose in the context of a negligent preparation of accounts for a company. Previous cases on negligent misstatements had fallen under the principle of Hedley Byrne v Heller. This stated that when a person makes a statement, he voluntarily assumes responsibility to the person he makes it to (or those who were in his contemplation). If the statement was made negligently, then he will be liable for any loss which results. The question in Caparo was the scope of the assumption of responsibility, and what the limits of liability ought to be.

On a preliminary issue as to whether a duty of care existed in the circumstances as alleged by the plaintiff, the plaintiff was unsuccessful at first instance but was successful in the Court of Appeal in establishing a duty of care might exist in the circumstances. Sir Thomas Bingham MR held that as a small shareholder, Caparo was entitled to rely on the accounts. Had Caparo been a simple outside investor, with no stake in the company, it would have had no claim. But because the auditors' work is primarily intended to be for the benefit of the shareholders, and Caparo did in fact have a small stake when it saw the company accounts, its claim was good. This was overturned by the House of Lords, which unanimously held there was no duty of care.

Facts
A company called Fidelity plc, manufacturers of electrical equipment, was the target of a takeover by Caparo Industries plc. Fidelity was not doing well. In March 1984 Fidelity had issued a profit warning, which had halved its share price. In May 1984 Fidelity's directors made a preliminary announcement in its annual profits for the year up to March. This confirmed the position was bad. The share price fell again. At this point Caparo had begun buying up shares in large numbers. In June 1984 the annual accounts, which were done with the help of the accountant Dickman, were issued to the shareholders, which now included Caparo. Caparo reached a shareholding of 29.9% of the company, at which point it made a general offer for the remaining shares, as the City Code's rules on takeovers required. But once it had control, Caparo found that Fidelity's accounts were in an even worse state than had been revealed by the directors or the auditors. It sued Dickman for negligence in preparing the accounts and sought to recover its losses. This was the difference in value between the company as it had and what it would have had if the accounts had been accurate.

Judgment

Court of Appeal

The majority of the Court of Appeal (Bingham LJ and Taylor LJ; O'Connor LJ dissenting) held that a duty was owed by the auditor to shareholders individually, and although it was not necessary to decide that in this case and the judgment was obiter, that a duty would not be owed to an outside investor who had no shareholding. Bingham LJ held that, for a duty owed to shareholders directly, the very purpose of publishing accounts was to inform investors so that they could make choices within a company about how to use their shares. But for outside investors, a relationship of proximity would be "tenuous" at best, and that it would certainly not be "fair, just and reasonable". O'Connor LJ, in dissent, would have held that no duty was owed at all to either group. He used the example of a shareholder and his friend both looking at an account report. He thought that if both went and invested, the friend who had no previous shareholding would certainly not have a sufficiently proximate relationship to the negligent auditor. So it would not be sensible or fair to say that the shareholder did either. Leave was given to appeal.

The "three stage" test, adopted from Sir Neil Lawson in the High Court, was elaborated by Bingham LJ (subsequently the Senior Law Lord) in his judgment at the Court of Appeal. In it he extrapolated from previously confusing cases what he thought were three main principles to be applied across the law of negligence for the duty of care:

House of Lords
Lord Bridge of Harwich who delivered the leading judgment restated the so-called "Caparo test" which Bingham LJ had formulated below. His decision was, following O'Connor LJ's dissent in the Court of Appeal, that no duty was owed at all, either to existing shareholders or to future investors by a negligent auditor. The purpose of the statutory requirement for an audit of public companies under the Companies Act 1985 was the making of a report to enable shareholders to exercise their class rights in general meeting. It did not extend to the provision of information to assist shareholders in the making of decisions as to future investment in the company. He said that the principles have developed since Anns v Merton London Borough Council. Indeed, even Lord Wilberforce had subsequently recognised that foreseeability alone was not a sufficient test of proximity. It is necessary to consider the particular circumstances and relationships which exist.

Lord Bridge then proceeded to analyse the particular facts of the case based upon principles of proximity and relationship. He referred approvingly to the dissenting judgment of Lord Justice Denning (as he then was) in Candler v Crane, Christmas & Co [1951] 2 KB 164 where Denning LJ held that the relationship must be one where the accountant or auditor preparing the accounts was aware of the particular person and purpose for which the accounts being prepared would be used. There could not be a duty owed in respect of "liability in an indeterminate amount for an indeterminate time to an indeterminate class" (Ultramares Corp v Touche, per Cardozo C.J New York Court of Appeals). Applying those principles, the defendants owed no duty of care to potential investors in the company who might acquire shares in the company on the basis of the audited accounts.

Lord Bridge concluded by answering the specific question of whether auditors should be liable to individual shareholders in tort, beyond a claim brought by a company. He referred to the Companies Act 1985 sections on auditors, and continued.

Lord Oliver and Lord Jauncey, Lord Roskill and Lord Ackner agreed.

Significance
 The judgment overturned the decision of a judge at first instance in JEB Fasteners Ltd v Marks Bloom & Co.
 Caparo and its extent were further discussed in Her Majesty's Commissioners of Customs and Excise v Barclays Bank Plc and Moore Stephens v Stone Rolls Ltd.
 In New Zealand, Caparo stands in disagreement with a decision of the New Zealand Court of Appeal in Scott Group Ltd v McFarlane. In both of these cases a duty of care was found in substantially similar circumstances.
 In Australia, Caparo was followed in Esanda Finance Corporation Ltd v Peat Marwick Hungerfords. Caparo is also noted for the comments made as to the analysis of Brennan J of the Australian High Court in Council of the Shire of Sutherland v Heyman espousing the proposition that the law should develop novel categories of negligence 'incrementally and by analogy with established categories'. That observation was subsequently rejected in Sullivan v Moody, in which the High Court stated, at [49] that the “three-stage test…in Caparo…does not represent the law in Australia.”
 In Canada, Caparo was followed in Hercules Managements Ltd. v. Ernst & Young. Cooper v Hobart is sometimes acknowledged to be the Canadian equivalent of Caparo.

Notes

External links
 Full text from BaiLII.org
 Case summary by IPSA LOQUITUR

House of Lords cases
English tort case law
1990 in case law
1990 in British law